Drakovci is a settlement in the eastern Slovene Hills in the Municipality of Ljutomer in northeastern Slovenia. The area traditionally belonged to the Styria region and is now included in the Mura Statistical Region.

Karel Grossmann, a pioneering Slovene filmmaker, was born in the village in 1864. The house in which he was born still stands and a commemorative plaque was unveiled on it in 1988.

References

External links
Drakovci on Geopedia

Populated places in the Municipality of Ljutomer